Hudson Bay was a former territorial electoral district, that elected Members to the Northwest Territories Legislature from 1979 until 1991. It was Abolished in 1987 when it became part of the Baffin South electoral district. The riding covered the entire Hudson Bay and the main community in the riding was Sanikiluaq in the Belcher Islands.

Members of the Legislative Assembly (MLAs)

Election results

1987 election

1983 election

1979 election

See also
Hudson Bay electoral district in Nunavut.

Former electoral districts of Northwest Territories